The Simunjan District is a district in the Samarahan Division of Sarawak, Malaysia, located between Serian and Sri Aman.

Most of its inhabitants are made up of the Malay and the Iban people.

Etymology
There are a few deviations regarding the origin of Simunjan name.  The first being when a Chinese merchant went to dry tobaccos during cloudy weather.  Based on this folklore, a Chinese merchant came to Simunjan on a boat known as Wangkang (Djong (ship)) to rest.  While at Simunjan, he tried to dry his tobaccos in the sun, but the weather was cloudy.  The local told them that his "Jan" ("tobacco" in Chinese) will be "Semun" (or "damp"); "Semunlah jan kau kelak" ("Your tobacco will get damp.")  Since this encounter, the place have been known as "Simunjan."

Another oral tradition speaks of Simunjan coming from the word "Semun" and "Hujan" (or "rain".)  In this version, Simunjan people originated from an area known as "Ensengei" that migrated to Simunjan.  Most of them worked as miners.  While trying to start a match, the match was damp due to the frequent rainfall.  Because this area was still unnamed, people combined "Semun" and "Hujan" to refer this place, hence "Simunjan."

Based on another source, Simunjan got its name from "Burung Munjan" ("Munjan Bird.")  Burung Munjan was to believe a bird native to Simunjan that was abundant within Gunung Ngeli forest.  Simunjan derived from the phrase "Si Munjan" (or "The Munjan") hence its name.  However, there are little resources that elaborate further regarding this version, except for a few mentions from locals.  A statue of Burung Munjan was erected around 1990, at Padang Sentral (Central Park) before was moved to Majlis Daerah Simunjan.  It is believed that Burung Munjan went extinct due to rampant human activities in Simunjan.

Famous persons
 Sapok Biki - Malaysian boxer who won a gold medal during the 1998 Commonwealth Games in Kuala Lumpur is a Simunjan native.

Climate
Simunjan has a tropical rainforest climate (Af) with heavy to very heavy rainfall year-round.

Neighbouring settlements
Neighbouring settlements include:

References

External links